The Lada XRAY is a compact crossover SUV produced by the Russian car manufacturer AvtoVAZ. Designed by a team led by Steve Mattin, the chief designer of the Lada Vesta, it was first presented as a concept in August 2012 at the Moscow International Automobile Salon. A newer version, the Lada XRAY Concept 2, debuted in August 2014. The production version of the Lada XRAY was released for sale in early 2016 and ceased in 2022 for inavailability of parts due to the Western sanctions after the Russian invasion of Ukraine.

Overview
The Lada XRAY debuted in August 2014 at the Moscow International Automobile Salon as a concept. The car was created on the basis of the Dacia Sandero hatchback produced by Automobile Dacia, subsidiary of Renault which has control over AvtoVAZ, but features an original design, engines, gearboxes, and various options, unavailable for the Sandero in the Russian market.

It went into production in December 2015. Lada XRAY is the first compact city crossover in the company’s history. The car’s design is based on the Dacia B0 platform and is the result of Renault’s and AVTOVAZ’s specialists. Production started in December 2015 in full compliance with the schedule previously announced by the company. It is produced at the Togliatti manufacturing site. The start of sales was held on February 14, 2016. Lada XRAY is available in 7 trim levels.

The Lada XRAY comes with a 1.6-liter 106 PS (78 kW) or 1.8-liter 122 PS (90 kW) petrol engines, a 5-speed automated manual gearbox is available as an option for the 1.8-liter version. The 1.6-liter Renault-Nissan HR16 petrol engine (110 HP, 81 kW) was discontinued from the range in July 2016.

Production
The first car body was assembled in Togliatti in October 2015 for testing, whereas the actual production of market vehicles started in December 2015. The first XRAYs appeared in the Russian market on 14 February 2016.

Lada XRAY Cross
In July, 2019, an updated version with the name 'Lada XRAY Cross' was launched. Supporting automatic transmission and multi media systems, like Android Auto and Apple Car Play. In April, 2020, the 'Lada XRAY Cross Instinct' version was launched, which is equipped with the Yandex.Auto multimedia system.

Lada XRAY Concept

The prototype was produced by Vercarmodel Saro in Italy, at a cost of $1,000,000. The crossover receives an equally edgy styling complete with a leather coated seating arrangement, along with a futuristic dashboard and infotainment system. It has a stylish exterior, featuring a pair of long and thin headlights. The front grille bears a resemblance to an “X”.

The name has two meanings: as an X-ray (a form of electromagnetic radiation) and as an abbreviation (X - crossover class, Recreation, Activity, Youth).

Reaction
According to Justin Cupler of TopSpeed, AvtoVAZ kept its Lada XRAY SUV under "such tight lock and key that it took all of us aback when it was debuted at the Moscow Motor Show". It was mentioned that Lada XRAY’s cabin also continues the progressive design of the exterior.

See also
Lada Largus
Lada Vesta
Nissan Almera
Dacia Sandero
Steve Mattin
Nissan B platform

References

External links
 Lada XRAY - official web site

XRAY
Cars introduced in 2012
2010s cars
Cars of Russia
Lada concept vehicles